Amgaon is a village in Kamrup district, situated on the north bank of the river Brahmaputra River.

Climate 
The region has a subtropical climate with warm summers and cold winters. The annual rainfall ranges from 1.5 to 2.6 meters. Low lying areas close to the Brahmaputra River may experience flooding from May through August.

References

Villages in Kamrup district